Al Tahrir (Arabic التحرير; The Liberation) is a privately owned classical Arabic 18-page daily published in Cairo, Egypt. It was named after the Tahrir Square in Cairo which witnessed demonstrations in the 2011 protests. The daily was the second publication launched after "the revolution".

History and ownership
The daily was launched in July 2011 following the ouster of Hosni Mubarak and was named after the Tahrir Square. It is the second daily started during the Egyptian Revolution of 2011.

One of its owners and board chairman is Ibrahim El Moellam, who also owns the independent Al Shorouk daily. Ibrahim Eissa is the other founder and editor-in-chief of the daily.

Content and editors
Al Tahrir is an 18-page daily. In July 2011, Ibrahim Mansour, the executive editor of the daily, argued that it primarily targets young readers, who "lost faith in the print media because it served the regime." Significant editors of the daily include Ibrahim Mansour, Belal Fadl, Omar Taher and Ahmed Esseily. Mahmoud Salem, who was a leading novelist, published weekly articles in the daily, the last of which involved criticisms over the Muslim Brotherhood in Egypt.

Following the US President Barack Obama's description of the July 2013 events in Egypt as a "coup" the daily published an English message on its front page on 4 July, saying "It's a revolution .. not a coup."

Political approach
The first issue of the daily reported "it will be a replica of Al Dostour in terms of its opinionated content and sarcastic flourishes." The initial approach of the paper was "to represent the voice of the January 25 Revolution," which opposed the Mubarak regime. It tries to challenge authoritarianism and corruption and all the red lines Egypt's rulers try to draw around a free press. Following the election of Abdel Fattah Sisi as president of Egypt the headline of the paper was "Egypt is in joy".

Controversy
In August 2012, Al Tahrir and two other dailies, Al-Masry Al-Youm and Al Watan, blanked their columns, protesting  the appointment of editors-in-chief by the Egyptian Shura Council. On 4 December 2012, Al Tahrir together with eleven papers and five TV channels went on strike for one day, protesting the draft constitution.

References

External links

2011 establishments in Egypt
Arabic-language newspapers
Daily newspapers published in Egypt
Newspapers published in Cairo
Publications established in 2011